Calycidoris guentheri is a species of sea slug, a dorid nudibranch, a shell-less marine gastropod mollusc in the family Calycidorididae.

Distribution
This species is confined to the Bering Sea.

References

Onchidorididae
Gastropods described in 1876